Millers Ferry is an unincorporated community in Wilcox County, Alabama, United States. The Millers Ferry Lock and Dam is located near the community on the Alabama River.

2007 tornado
On March 1, 2007, Millers Ferry was struck by a violent EF4 tornado. One person was killed, two others were injured, and over 70 houses were damaged or destroyed. The tornado caused well over $2 million in damage.

Gallery
Below are photographs taken in Millers Ferry as part of the Historic American Buildings Survey:

References

Unincorporated communities in Alabama
Unincorporated communities in Wilcox County, Alabama